Angelos Postecoglou (born 27 August 1965) is an Australian association football manager and former player, who is the current manager of Scottish Premiership club Celtic.

He spent most of his club career as a defender for South Melbourne Hellas, and played four games for the Australia national team in the late 1980s. He began managing at South Melbourne Hellas in 1996, winning the National Soccer League twice and the OFC Champions League in 1999. He then led the national under-17 and under-20 teams.

Postecoglou managed Brisbane Roar and Melbourne Victory in the A-League, winning the Premiership in 2011 and the Championship in 2011 and 2012 for the former. He was the senior national team manager from 2013 to 2017, winning the AFC Asian Cup in 2015 and also going to the 2014 FIFA World Cup. He won the J1 League with Yokohama F. Marinos in 2019 and the Scottish Premiership and Scottish League Cup for Celtic in 2021–22 and the Scottish League Cup for Celtic in 2022-23.

Early life
Postecoglou was born in the Nea Filadelfia neighbourhood of Athens, Greece. After his father, Dimitris ("Jim"), lost his business following the 1967 Greek military coup, Postecoglou emigrated to Australia by boat in 1970 at the age of five, growing up in Melbourne, Victoria.

Playing career
After first joining South Melbourne Hellas as a nine year old,
Postecoglou rose through the youth ranks to play 193 games from 1984 to 1993 for them in the National Soccer League as a one-club player.

As a player, he was involved in their 1984 and 1990–91 titles, the latter as captain in a famous win over rivals Melbourne Knights. He was coached by Hungarian Ferenc Puskás, a renowned player who his father had told him about as a child. According to Postecoglou, Puskás played a 4–3–3 formation with rigid full-backs and attacking wingers. Postecoglou built on this strategy in his own coaching, however his use of attacking full backs in a non-traditional inverted position differs from Puskás.

A knee injury would prematurely end Postecoglou's promising career. In 2000, Postecoglou would be named as the starting left back in South Melbourne's team of the century as voted by fans and an expert panel.

International career
Postecoglou represented Australia at a senior level four times between 1986 and 1988 as well as representing Australia at youth level in 1985.

Coaching career

South Melbourne
Following his retirement, Postecoglou took up the role of an assistant coach at South Melbourne. Postecoglou gained the head coaching position in 1996, following the firing of Frank Arok.

He led South to consecutive National Soccer League titles in 1997–98 (ending a 7-year drought) and 1998–99, as well as winning the 1999 Oceania Club Championship, which in turn led to South's participation in the 2000 FIFA Club World Championship. 

After the 1999–2000 NSL season, he stood down from the South Melbourne coaching role when he was appointed coach of the Australian youth team. He is the only person to have been involved in all four of South Melbourne's NSL title-winning teams, the first two as a player and the latter two as coach.

Young Socceroos
Following his domestic coaching success, Postecoglou became coach of Australia's youth sides in 2000. During his tenure, he played a role in identifying and developing Australian players. Postecoglou was involved in an on-air argument with football pundit Craig Foster on The World Game. He was replaced as coach in February 2007 after Australia failed to qualify for the 2007 FIFA U-20 World Cup. After his departure as coach of the Australian youth teams, Postecoglou worked as a football pundit for Fox Sports and as an elite consultant to Football Federation Victoria.

Feeling that his much-publicised argument with Foster had made him unemployable, Postecoglou coached Panachaiki in the Greek third division, and Whittlesea Zebras back in Melbourne, while running coaching clinics in the city.

Brisbane Roar
On 16 October 2009, Postecoglou was signed as the new Brisbane Roar coach, replacing Frank Farina. Postecoglou started rebuilding the team by releasing Liam Reddy, Craig Moore, Bob Malcolm and Charlie Miller. Tommy Oar, Michael Zullo and Adam Sarota were bought by Dutch club FC Utrecht and striker Sergio van Dijk went to Adelaide United. Postecoglou, who asked to be judged a year from the time he took over, proved the critics wrong by winning and playing an entertaining brand of football.

The 4–0 win against Adelaide United in round 13 was highly praised in the media as some of the best football the A-League has ever seen. Postecoglou led the Roar to the Premiership and Championship in the 2010–11 season, winning the Grand Final 4–2 on penalties against the Central Coast Mariners in front of 52,168 people at Lang Park. The Roar only lost one game all season and went on a 36-game unbeaten run, which broke the previous Australian football record. On 18 March 2011, he signed a two-year extension with the club keeping him until the 2013–14 season.

In the 2011–12 season, Brisbane Roar became the first team to win back-to-back A-League championships and Postecoglou became the most successful Australian domestic football (soccer) coach, with four national titles.

On 24 April 2012, Postecoglou announced his resignation as head coach of Brisbane Roar. Postecoglou left the Roar after two-and-a-half years, during which he led the club to back-to-back A-League championships, a premiership and consecutive qualification for the AFC Champions League.

Melbourne Victory
On 26 April 2012, it was announced that he had signed a three-year contract with A-League club Melbourne Victory as head coach. Postecoglou started rebuilding the team by releasing Matthew Kemp, Grant Brebner, Rodrigo Vargas, Tom Pondeljak, Ante Čović, Carlos Hernández, Harry Kewell and Fabio Alves, with Jean Carlos Solórzano and Ubay Luzardo returned to their respective clubs after their loan deals had expired. Postecoglou rounded up his squad by signing Jonathan Bru, Guilherme Finkler, Adama Traoré, Marcos Flores, Mark Milligan, Theo Markelis, Sam Gallagher and Spase Dilevski.

Postecoglou's first game in charge of Melbourne Victory was the Round 1 clash against crosstown rivals Melbourne Heart, an encounter which the Victory lost 2–1. His first win came against Adelaide United in Round 4, with the Victory prevailing 2–1. The following year, Melbourne Victory made the A-League Preliminary Final after beating Perth Glory in an Elimination Final 2–1 at Docklands Stadium. Melbourne Victory then played in the Preliminary Final against Central Coast Mariners and lost 2–0.

Australia national team

Postecoglou was appointed head coach of the Australia national team on 23 October 2013 on a five-year contract, replacing German Holger Osieck. Postecoglou was tasked with regenerating the Australian national team, which was deemed to have been too reliant on members of their Golden Generation of 2006, subsequently leading to a stagnation of results that culminated in successive 6–0 defeats to Brazil and France. In his first game as Australia's manager, a home friendly match against Costa Rica, Australia won 1–0, courtesy of a goal from Tim Cahill.

For the 2014 FIFA World Cup, Australia were drawn in Group B alongside holders Spain, 2010 runners-up the Netherlands and Chile. The team lost to Chile 3–1 and the Netherlands 3–2 to be eliminated from Group B, and concluded with a 3–0 loss to also eliminated Spain. Australia's competitive performances in a difficult group led to belief that a new Golden Generation was about to begin.

Postecoglou coached Australia in 2015 AFC Asian Cup, where they beat Kuwait (4–1) and Oman (4–0), but lost to South Korea (0–1) in the group stage. They then beat China 2–0 in the quarter-final and the United Arab Emirates 2–0 in the semi-final. Australia beat South Korea 2–1 after extra time to win in the final for its first AFC Asian Cup.

Two weeks after Australia qualified for the 2018 FIFA World Cup, on 22 November 2017, Postecoglou announced his resignation as Socceroos coach.

Yokohama F. Marinos
On 19 December 2017 Yokohama F. Marinos announced they had appointed Postecoglou as head coach at the Succession of the 2017 Japanese Emperor's Cup. Postecoglou's first domestic game as coach of Yokohama ended with a 1–1 draw against Cerezo Osaka at Yanmar Stadium, Osaka. After an initial difficult start to the season, which saw Yokohama F. Marinos facing potential relegation, Postecoglou guided the club to the final of the J-League Cup, and a 12th place finish in the league. Although the club finished with the second highest number of goals scored in the season, they also conceded the third most goals of any club during the season.

After receiving interest from the Greece national team to become their new manager, Postecoglou extended his contract with Yokohama F. Marinos. Yokohama's belief in Postecoglou was rewarded during the 2019 season when he guided the club to their first J. League title in 15 years. In doing so, he became the first Australian manager to win a league title in Japan.

Celtic
Postecoglou became the manager of Scottish Premiership club Celtic on 10 June 2021, signing a 12-month rolling contract, making him the first Australian manager to coach a major club in Europe. Celtic, who had just lost their league title to Rangers for the first time in a decade, had abruptly missed out on hiring English manager Eddie Howe. The new appointment was mocked by Celtic fan and Talksport presenter Alan Brazil, who apologised on his show a year later, after Postecoglou had won the league. Australian Celtic player Tom Rogic reflected on the atmosphere at the appointment: "I laugh sometimes when I look back. Although I knew him quite well, there was a perception of: 'Who's this guy?'".

Postecoglou made his debut in a UEFA Champions League qualifier on 20 July, drawing 1–1 against Danish Superliga club FC Midtjylland; a 2–1 loss in the second leg in Denmark led to elimination eight days later. He lost his first league game 2–1 away to Heart of Midlothian on 31 July.

On 19 December 2021, Celtic won the Scottish League Cup after defeating Hibernian 2–1 at Hampden Park in the final. The following 2 February, a 3–0 win over rivals Rangers put Celtic to the top of the league table for the first time in the season, ending a 13-game unbeaten start for opposing manager Giovanni van Bronckhorst. Having not let their lead slip, the league title was sealed on 11 May with a game remaining, after a 1–1 draw at Dundee United. Postecoglou became the first Australian to win a league title in Europe. He was the league Manager of the Month five times in his first season, for October 2021 and January to April 2022, while winning the PFA Scotland Manager of the Year and SFWA Manager of the Year.

Personal life
Postecoglou grew up in Melbourne, Victoria. From an early age he started playing Australian rules football and became a lifelong supporter of the Carlton Football Club in the Australian Football League.

Postecoglou is married to Georgia, who worked at South Melbourne as a marketing manager when he served as manager of the club. Together they have three sons, James, Max and Alexi. Their oldest son, James, currently serves with the Hellenic Armed Forces and is based in Lemnos. 

He said in a 2018 interview that his father, who died the very same year, worked hard every day of his life: "People say they go to another country for a better life. My parents did not have a better life, they went to Australia to provide opportunities for me to have a better life." Father and son had time together only during their outings together to association football games, from where young Ange got a life-long "fascination" with the sport. He said of his management "My motivation is always to produce teams [my] dad would enjoy watching." Postecoglou also grew up supporting Liverpool and AEK Athens.

In November 2022, Postecoglou was inducted into the Football Australia Hall of Fame for his outstanding contribution to Australian football on and off the field as a player and as a coach.

Honours

Player 

South Melbourne

 NSL Championship: 1984, 1990–91
 NSL Premiership: 1992–93
 NSL Southern Conference: 1984, 1985
 NSL Cup: 1989–90
 Dockerty Cup: 1989, 1991
 Buffalo Cup: 1988

Australia

 Trans-Tasman Cup: 1988

Manager
South Melbourne
NSL Premiership: 1997–98
NSL Championship: 1997–98, 1998–99
Oceania Club Championship: 1999

Brisbane Roar
A-League Premiership: 2010–11
A-League Championship: 2010–11, 2011–12

Australia U17
OFC U-17 Championship: 2001, 2003, 2005

Australia U20
OFC U-20 Championship: 2001, 2002, 2005
AFF U-19 Youth Championship: 2006

Australia
AFC Asian Cup: 2015

Yokohama F. Marinos
J1 League: 2019

Celtic
Scottish Premiership: 2021–22
Scottish League Cup: 2021–22, 2022–23

Individual
National Soccer League Coach of the Year: 1997–98
Australian Sports Medal: 2000
PFA Manager of the Year: 2010–11
A-League Coach of the Year: 2010–11
PFA Manager of the Decade: 2015
AFC Coach of the Year: 2015
Scottish Premiership Manager of the Month: October 2021, January 2022, February 2022, March 2022, April 2022, August 2022, September/October 2022
PFA Scotland Manager of the Year: 2021–22
SFWA Manager of the Year: 2021–22

 Football Australia Hall of Fame inductee: 2022

Records
With Brisbane Roar
Longest undefeated streak in Australian sporting history: 36 games (2011–12)

Managerial statistics

References

External links

 Melbourne Victory profile
 Oz Football profile
 

1965 births
Living people
Footballers from Athens
Greek emigrants to Australia
Australian soccer players
Association football defenders
South Melbourne FC players
National Soccer League (Australia) players
Australia international soccer players
Australian soccer coaches
South Melbourne FC managers
Panachaiki F.C. managers
Brisbane Roar FC managers
Melbourne Victory FC managers
Australia national soccer team managers
Yokohama F. Marinos managers
Celtic F.C. managers
National Soccer League (Australia) coaches

A-League Men managers
J1 League managers
Scottish Professional Football League managers
2014 FIFA World Cup managers
2015 AFC Asian Cup managers
2017 FIFA Confederations Cup managers
AFC Asian Cup-winning managers
Australian expatriate soccer coaches
Australian expatriate sportspeople in Japan
Australian expatriate sportspeople in Scotland
Expatriate football managers in Japan
Expatriate football managers in Scotland
Association football coaches
Naturalised soccer players of Australia
Soccer players from Melbourne
Australia under-20 international soccer players
Greek footballers
Greek expatriate football managers